Mohra Awan is a  small village located near Padshahan at  33° 0'47.40"N and  73° 3'17.11"E in Chakwal District, Punjab (Pakistan). Mohra Awan has one primary school for boys and one for girls. The majority of the people are in Army.

References 

Chakwal District
Populated places in Chakwal District